Barolineocerus bispinus is a species of leafhopper native to French Guiana. It is the holotype for the genus Barolineocerus. It is named for the pair of spines on the male anal tube. It is distinguished from other species in the genus on the basis of the spines on the male anal tube and the small spines on the reproductive organ.

References

Insects described in 2008
Hemiptera of South America
Eurymelinae